Diego del Morao (born 1979 in Jerez de la Frontera) is a gipsy flamenco guitarist. He is the son of the late Moraíto Chico II who he learned to play from and also attended El Carbonero's school. He has recorded live albums such as Confí de fuá, No hay quinto malo and La rosa blanca. He has performed with the likes of José Mercé, José Mercé, Vicente Soto Sordera, and Diego Carrasco.

External links 

 Official website

References

Spanish flamenco guitarists
Spanish male guitarists
1979 births
Living people
People from Jerez de la Frontera
Flamenco guitarists
21st-century guitarists
21st-century male musicians